Shahbajwan is a village in Gopalganj, Bihar, situated near Turkahan near Thawe road. It is a small village.
Although, it's not a big village, Shahbajwan is well known among city people due to its literacy rate and participation in social activities

History 
It was believed to be part of village Fathan, due to interruption of a river it became isolated. This river later meet to Gandhak river. Jobs are also available there. Ancient history is still a mystery. In 1996 it was officially declared as a village.

Location  
Shahbazwan is located near the Turkahan – Thawe road. It is in back side of Government School named M.M.M Urdu High School.

References 

Villages in Gopalganj district, India